Robert K. Garriott (born December 7, 1956) is an American video game industry figure and entrepreneur.  He co-founded Origin Systems and Destination Games with his brother, Richard Garriott, and was the CEO of NCsoft-North America until 2008.  He is the second-eldest son of NASA astronaut Owen K. Garriott.

Garriott graduated from the MIT Sloan School of Management in 1983 with a Master of Science in Management and also earned degrees in Electrical Engineering from Rice University, and a master's degree in Engineering Economic Systems from Stanford University.

In 1983 he co-founded computer game developer Origin Systems with his younger brother Richard "Lord British" Garriott.  He was a vice president and later an executive vice president at Electronic Arts (EA) after the company acquired Origin in 1992.  Garriott left EA in 1995 and co-founded Destination Games in 2000. Destination was bought by NCsoft in 2001 and he became president and CEO of NCsoft-North America.

References

Video game businesspeople
American technology company founders
1956 births
Living people
Origin Systems people
MIT Sloan School of Management alumni
Rice University alumni
Stanford University alumni
20th-century American businesspeople
21st-century American businesspeople